The Little Union River is a  river in Porcupine Mountains Wilderness State Park on the Upper Peninsula of Michigan in the United States. It is a tributary of the Union River, which flows to Lake Superior.

See also
List of rivers of Michigan

References

Michigan  Streamflow Data from the USGS

Rivers of Michigan
Tributaries of Lake Superior